Tŵr Mawr lighthouse (meaning "great tower" in Welsh), on Ynys Llanddwyn on Anglesey, Wales, marks the western entrance to the Menai Strait.

History
The 1873 tower is tapered in a style characteristic of Anglesey windmills. It may have been constructed by an Anglesey stone mason, and it is possible that the tower itself was originally used as a windmill.

The lantern and fittings cost £250 7s 6d, including the adaptation of an "earlier tower". The north-east door is flanked by small windows, and the two floors above also have small windows, but the top does not. The conical roof is slated and has a flagpole. The optic, silver-plated reflector and Fresnel lens are dated 1861 and were used into the 1970s. The lantern was originally lit by six Argand lamps with reflectors.

A smaller, conical tower, with a domed top, can be found to the south-east, and may be an earlier structure.

Neither tower is shown on the chart of Lewis Morris, dated 1800, but they both appear on the Ordnance Survey 1818-1823 2 inches/mile map. They both probably originated as unlit markers. The cottages nearby have been used as craft workshops, and the local community here once serviced pilot-boats and lifeboats.

See also
 List of lighthouses in Wales

References

External links

Lighthouses completed in 1873
Lighthouses in Anglesey
1873 establishments in Wales
Grade II listed lighthouses
Grade II listed buildings in Anglesey